Liam Kofi Bright is a British philosopher of science who is an assistant professor or lecturer in the department of philosophy, logic, and scientific method at the London School of Economics and Political Science. He works primarily on formal social epistemology, particularly the social epistemology of science. Some of his other work has been on Africana philosophy and formal modelling of social phenomena like intersectionality. Bright won the Philip Leverhulme Prize in the category of philosophy and theology in 2020.

Early life and education 
Bright received a bachelor's degree in philosophy from the University of Warwick, a Master of Science degree in the philosophy of science from the London School of Economics and Political Science, and Master of Science and Doctor of Philosophy degrees in logic, computation, and methodology from the philosophy department at Carnegie Mellon University under the direction of the philosopher Kevin Zollman.

Work 
Most of Bright's work involves formal models of the epistemology of science and institutional scientific practices such as peer review. Some of his other work has revolved around the thought of Africana philosophers like W. E. B. Du Bois (whose work he has twice been invited to BBC Radio 4 to discuss) and on formalizations of phenomena like intersectionality.

References

External links 
 
 

British Africanists
Epistemologists
Living people
Philosophers of science
Year of birth missing (living people)